Pyrgos may refer to:

 Pyrgos, Elis, a municipality in Greece
 Pyrgos, Limassol, a village in Cyprus
 Kato Pyrgos, a village in Cyprus
 Pano Pyrgos, a village in Cyprus